The 2019 United Kingdom general election was held on 12 December 2019 to elect all 650 members of the House of Commons, including 18 seats in Northern Ireland. 1,293,971 people were eligible to vote, up 51,273 from the 2017 general election. 62.09% of eligible voters turned out, down 3.5 percentage points from the last general election. For the first time in history, traditional Irish nationalist parties won more seats than traditional British unionist parties.

Electoral system
MPs were elected in 18 Single Member constituencies by first-past-the-post.

Background
The election was called on 29 October 2019 under the Early Parliamentary General Election Act 2019. At the 2017 election, the nationalist Social Democratic and Labour Party (SDLP) and the Ulster Unionist Party (UUP) lost all of their seats. The DUP won 10 seats, Sinn Féin won 7 seats, and Independent Unionist Sylvia Hermon was also elected. The election ended in a hung parliament, and the Democratic Unionist Party (DUP) signed a confidence and supply agreement with the Conservative Party.

In 2018, Sinn Féin MP for West Tyrone, Barry McElduff, resigned after a social media post he made caused controversy regarding perceived sectarianism on the Kingsmill massacre. The party won a by-election later, but with a plurality instead of a majority.

In the 2019 European Parliament election, Sinn Féin, the DUP, and the Alliance Party each won a seat.

Participating parties
102 candidates stood in the general election. The Alliance Party was the only party standing in all 18 seats. The DUP stood in 17 seats, the UUP in 16, and both Sinn Féin and the SDLP in 15 seats. Aontú stood in 7 seats, the Northern Ireland Conservatives in 4, the Green Party of Northern Ireland in 3, and People Before Profit and the UK Independence Party in 2. Traditional Unionist Voice did not stand in this election. There were also three independent candidates. Sylvia Hermon did not contest this election.

Sinn Féin operates on an all-Ireland basis. Their MPs in Westminster practice abstentionism, meaning they do not take their seats in the House of Commons. Aontú, who like Sinn Féin are an abstentionist all-Ireland party, was formed in January 2019.

Opinion polling

Results

Results by constituency

See also 
 2019 United Kingdom general election in England
 2019 United Kingdom general election in Scotland
 2019 United Kingdom general election in Wales

Footnotes

References

External links
Manifestos:
 Alliance
 Aontú election broadcast
 DUP
 SDLP
 UUP

2019 in Northern Ireland
Northern Ireland
2019
2019 elections in Northern Ireland